Macon County is a county located in the U.S. state of Tennessee As of the 2020 census, the population was 25,216. Its county seat is Lafayette. Macon County is part of the Nashville-Davidson–Murfreesboro–Franklin, TN Metropolitan Statistical Area.

History

Macon County was formed in 1842 from parts of Smith and Sumner counties.  It was named in honor of the late Revolutionary War veteran and United States Senator, Nathaniel Macon.  The county seat was named in honor of the Marquis de Lafayette.

The county's second-largest city, Red Boiling Springs, thrived as a mineral springs resort in the late 19th and early 20th centuries.  Three hotels from this period– the Donoho Hotel, the Thomas House Hotel (previously the Cloyd Hotel), and the Armour's Hotel (previously the Counts Hotel)– are still open, though only the Armour's still offers mineral water treatments.

Geography
The county is located amidst the northeastern Highland Rim, and is generally rugged and hilly.

Adjacent Counties
Monroe County, Kentucky (northeast)
Clay County (east)
Jackson County (southeast)
Smith County (south)
Trousdale County (southwest)
Sumner County (west)
Allen County, Kentucky (northwest)

Demographics

2020 Census

As of the 2020 United States census, there were 25,216 people, 9,170 households, and 6,215 families residing in the county.

2010 Census
At the 2010 census, there were 22,248 people, 8,561 households, and 6,112 families living in the county. The population density was 72 people per square mile (28/km2). There were 9,861 housing units at an average density of 32 per square mile (12/km2). The racial makeup of the county was 96.03% White, 0.42% Black or African American, 0.35% Native American, 0.20% Asian, 0.01% Pacific Islander, 1.96% from other races, and 1.04% from two or more races. 4.13% of the population were Hispanic or Latino of any race.

Of the 8,561 households 30.16% had children under the age of 18 living with them, 54.55% were married couples living together, 5.58% had a male householder with no wife present, 11.26% had a female householder with no husband present, and 28.61% were non-families. 24.27% of households were one person and 10.86% were one person aged 65 or older. The average household size was 2.57 and the average family size was 3.02.

The age distribution was 25.02% under the age of 18, 8.39% from 18 to 24, 31.59% from 25 to 44, 20.69% from 45 to 64, and 14.09% 65 or older. The median age was 38.7 years. For every 100 females, there were 97.08 males. For every 100 females age 18 and over, there were 95.21 males.

2000 Census
At the 2000 census there were 20,386 people, 7,916 households, and 5,802 families living in the county. The population density was 66 people per square mile (26/km2). There were 8,894 housing units at an average density of 29 per square mile (11/km2).  The racial makeup of the county was 97.86% White, 0.22% Black or African American, 0.42% Native American, 0.24% Asian, 0.07% Pacific Islander, 0.77% from other races, and 0.44% from two or more races. 1.71% of the population were Hispanic or Latino of any race.
Of the 7,916 households 35.00% had children under the age of 18 living with them, 60.70% were married couples living together, 8.80% had a female householder with no husband present, and 26.70% were non-families. 23.80% of households were one person and 10.70% were one person aged 65 or older. The average household size was 2.55 and the average family size was 3.00.

The age distribution was 26.10% under the age of 18, 8.50% from 18 to 24, 29.40% from 25 to 44, 23.30% from 45 to 64, and 12.70% 65 or older. The median age was 36 years. For every 100 females, there were 97.40 males. For every 100 females age 18 and over, there were 95.10 males.

The median household income was $29,867 and the median family income  was $37,577. Males had a median income of $28,170 versus $20,087 for females. The per capita income for the county was $15,286. About 11.30% of families and 15.10% of the population were below the poverty line, including 17.00% of those under age 18 and 25.40% of those age 65 or over.

Communities

Cities
Lafayette (county seat)
Red Boiling Springs

Unincorporated communities
Beech Bottom
Beech Hill
Hillsdale
Willette

Transportation

Highways

Airport
Lafayette Municipal Airport

Politics

Although part of the Middle Tennessee Grand Division, Macon County is geographically firmly a part of Kentucky's Pennyroyal Plateau and has much more historically in common with adjacent Bluegrass State counties like Monroe, Clinton and Cumberland, or with counties in East Tennessee. Those Pennyroyal counties were overwhelmingly opposed to secession and a large majority of residents fought their Civil War in Union blue rather than Confederate gray. Consequently, after the Civil War, Macon County became an isolated powerfully Republican County in then-Democratic Middle Tennessee. Since 1884, the only Democratic presidential candidate to carry Macon County has been Bill Clinton in 1992, when he had Tennessee Senator Al Gore – who lived in neighbouring Smith County as a child – as his running mate. In the 2000 election, Gore's local popularity was sufficient to give him the third-highest Democratic percentage of the past 132 years despite losing the state, but since then like all of Appalachia and surrounding regions the county has shown an extremely rapid trend to the Republican Party due to powerful opposition to the Democratic Party's liberal views on social issues.

In other statewide elections, Macon County has shown a similar rapid Republican trend. It voted for a Democratic Senator as recently as the 2002 election, when Bob Clement defeated Lamar Alexander by a mere nineteen votes, but for the last three senatorial elections the Democratic candidate has not obtained more than 22.09 percent of the county's vote. Although Phil Bredesen carried the county in both 2002 and 2006, he is the last Democratic gubernatorial candidate to top thirty percent.

County Government Officials
 County Mayor: Steve Jones
 Assessor of Property: Rick Shoulders
 Trustee: Kim Parks
 Sheriff: Mark Gammons
 County Clerk: Connie Blackwell
 Register of Deeds: Cynthia Jones

County Commission Members
 Phillip Snow
 Todd Gentry
 Scott Gammons
 Mike Jenkins
 Benton Bartley
 Charles (Chop) Porter
 Mchelle Phillips
 Justin Dyer
 Kenneth Witte
 Scott Cothron
 Tony Wix
 Michael Slayton
 Jeff Hughes
 Barry King
 Chad West
 Kyle Petty
 Wendell Jones
 Jarhea Wilmore
 Helen Hesson
 Marcus Smith

State and Federal Representation
 State Representative: Kelly Keisling
 State Senator: Mark Pody
 Congressional Representative: John Rose

Media

Newspapers
 Macon County Chronicle
 Macon County Times

Radio
 WEEN 97.5 FM
 WLCT 102.1 FM
 WEEN 1460 AM

Television
Macon County is part of the Nashville media market.

See also
National Register of Historic Places listings in Macon County, Tennessee

References

External links

Official site
Macon County Chamber of Commerce
Tennessee Central Economic Alliance for Macon County 

 Macon County, TNGenWeb - free genealogy resources for the county

 
1842 establishments in Tennessee
Populated places established in 1842
Nashville metropolitan area
Counties of Appalachia
Middle Tennessee